Syuren (Hüräm) is a rural locality (a khutor) in Uralsky Selsoviet, Kugarchinsky District, Bashkortostan, Russia. The population was 11 as of 2010. There is 1 street.

Geography 
Syuren is located 30 km northeast of Mrakovo (the district's administrative centre) by road. Sygarysh is the nearest rural locality.

References 

Rural localities in Kugarchinsky District